The Tingi Hills Forest Reserve is located in a mountain range in the east of Sierra Leone and occupies an area of .   It became a forest reserve in 1947 and a non-hunting forest reserve in 1973.  The area reaches from an altitude of 400 to 1850 metres at the north peak of the dual peaked Sankan Biriwa massif. In the lower regions the area consists of forest interspersed with savannah then moves into shrub savannah and then mountain grassland at higher altitudes. Over 200 species of birds have been recorded in the area and the reserve is also home to western baboons and forest elephants.

See also
 Protected areas of Sierra Leone

References

Afromontane
Guinean montane forests
Forest reserves of Sierra Leone